The 1500 metres at the 2000 Summer Olympics as part of the athletics programme were held at Stadium Australia on Monday 25 September, Wednesday 27 September, and Friday 29 September 2000. Forty-one athletes from 26 nations competed. The maximum number of athletes per nation had been set at 3 since the 1930 Olympic Congress. The event was won by Noah Ngeny of Kenya, the nation's first title in the event since 1988 and third overall. Hicham El Guerrouj of Morocco took second, matching the nation's best result in the event (Rachid El Basir's silver in 1992).

Summary

World record holder Hicham El Guerrouj was the clear favorite coming into the race, but he had a reputation for setting records in races set up by a pacemaker.  His countryman Youssef Baba provided the service, sacrificing his own ambition in the final, he took the pace out in 54.14, the two Moroccan teammates leading the two Kenyan challengers Noah Ngeny and Bernard Lagat, separating from the rest of the field.  On the second lap the pace lagged to 60.63, letting the other runners back in.  Baba disappeared quickly leaving El Guerrouj to burn off the Kenyans taking the third lap in 56.90.  But the Kenyans remained close with Mehdi Baala a step behind.  Through the final turn Ngeny executed a textbook kick, moving onto El Guerrouj's shoulder, sliding into the second lane and sprinting past him for the gold.  Lagat moved into lane 3 with hopes of passing as well but ran out of real estate to take the bronze.

Background

This was the 24th appearance of the event, which is one of 12 athletics events to have been held at every Summer Olympics. Five finalists from 1996 returned: gold medalist Noureddine Morceli of Algeria, seventh-place finisher Marko Koers of the Netherlands, tenth-place finisher Driss Maazouzi of Morocco, eleventh-place finisher John Mayock of Great Britain, and twelfth-place finisher Hicham El Guerrouj of Morocco. El Guerrouj had been disappointed by the finish in Atlanta; expected to challenge for gold, he had tripped and fallen. Since the 1996 Games, he had won both world championships (1997 and 1999) and broken the world record; "[m]any people were calling [him] the greatest miler in history."

For the first time, no nations made their debut in the 1500 metres. The United States made its 23rd appearance, most of all nations (having missed only the boycotted 1980 Games).

Qualification

Each National Olympic Committee was permitted to enter up to three athletes that had run 3:36.80 or faster during the qualification period. The maximum number of athletes per nation had been set at 3 since the 1930 Olympic Congress. If an NOC had no athletes that qualified under that standard, one athlete that had run 3:39.50 or faster could be entered.

Competition format

The competition was again three rounds (used previously in 1952 and since 1964). The "fastest loser" system introduced in 1964 was used for both the first round and semifinals. The 12-man semifinals and finals introduced in 1984 and used since 1992 were retained.

The field was smaller than before; there were three heats in the first round, each with 13 or 14 runners. The top six runners in each heat, along with the next six fastest overall, advanced to the semifinals. The 24 semifinalists were divided into two semifinals, each with 12 runners. The top five men in each semifinal, plus the next two fastest overall, advanced to the 12-man final.

Records

These were the standing world and Olympic records prior to the 2000 Summer Olympics.

The 16-year-old Olympic record fell to Noah Ngeny in the final, who set a new record at 3:32.07. All three medalists came in under the old record time.

The following national records were established during the competition:

Schedule

All times are Australian Eastern Standard Time (UTC+10)

Results

Round 1

Heat 1

Heat 2

Heat 3

Overall results for Round 1

Semifinals

Semifinal 1

Semifinal 2

Overall results for semifinals

Final

References

External links
 Official Report of the 2000 Sydney Summer Olympics

Athletics at the 2000 Summer Olympics
1500 metres at the Olympics
Men's events at the 2000 Summer Olympics